Benefit of the Doubt may refer to:
 Benefit of the Doubt (1967 film), a British documentary
 Benefit of the Doubt (1993 film), an English-language German thriller
 Jesse Stone: Benefit of the Doubt, a 2012 American television film 
 The Benefit of the Doubt, a 2017 Belgian thriller film
 "Benefit of Doubt" (Maverick), a 1961 TV episode